This is a list of books that topped The New York Times Best Seller list in the adult fiction category in 1949.

Only four novels topped the list that year, which was dominated by  John P. Marquand's Point of No Return which spent 22 straight weeks at the top of the list though it only lasted 34 weeks in the top 15 overall. Marquand's book is notable for its lampooning of  W. Lloyd Warner, an anthropologist with whom Marquand had a personal grudge. Point of No Return was toppled by John O'Hara's Rage To Live, which spent 6 weeks at the top. That book stayed in the top five for another 20 weeks but the remainder of the year was dominated by The Egyptian by the Finnish author Mika Waltari. The Egyptian was translated from a Swedish translation by Naomi Walford.

See also
 Publishers Weekly list of bestselling novels in the United States in the 1940s

References

1949
.
1949 in the United States